Luetkesaurus is an extinct genus of plesiosaur from the Late Cretaceous of what is now the Kursk area of western Russia. Luetkesaurus was first named by V. Kiprijanoff in 1883, in honor of paleontologist and zoologist Christian Frederich Luetken; no type species has ever been designated. The genus is considered dubious, based on isolated teeth and vertebrae.

See also
 List of plesiosaur genera
 Timeline of plesiosaur research

References
 Benton, Michael J., Shishkin, Mikhail A., and Unwin, David M. (2003) The Age of Dinosaurs in Russia and Mongolia. Cambridge University Press, 733 pp .

External links
 Luetkesaurus Professor Paul's Guide to Reptiles

Late Cretaceous plesiosaurs of Europe
Fossil taxa described in 1883